"Maids When You're Young Never Wed An Old Man" is a single by the Dubliners released in December 1967. The song was seen to be offensive due to its sexualized themes and was banned by RTÉ and the BBC, resulting in its failing to make the UK top 40, instead peaking at No.43. It was the Dubliners' last hit single for over 20 years in the UK. The song also failed to make the top ten in Ireland, peaking at No.11.

Charts

References

1967 songs
The Dubliners songs
1967 singles
Major Minor Records singles